Circus Kid (also known as Circus Kids) is a 1994 Hong Kong martial arts action film directed by Wu Ma. This film stars Yuen Biao, Irene Wan, Donnie Yen and Wu himself.

Plot
The circus group performs at the Shanfa Circus when a huge load of bombs crash on the stage and the performers try to find a home to live and get money for food.

Cast
Yuen Biao as Lo Yi-tung/Han
Donnie Yen as Danton Lee 
Wu Ma as Master Shen Tinyi
Irene Wan as Lan
Lily Lee as May
David Lam as Chiang Yitien
Woo Ying-man
Ken Lo as Lung 
Bey Logan as Melchior Owen
Yuen Miu (cameo)
Bei Lou-kam
Kam Sap-yee
Zheng Shuang

See also
 Yuen Biao filmography
 Donnie Yen filmography

External links
 
 Circus Kid at Hong Kong Cinemagic
 

1994 films
1994 martial arts films
1990s action films
Hong Kong action films
Hong Kong martial arts films
Circus films
Kung fu films
1990s Cantonese-language films
Films directed by Wu Ma
Films about drugs
Films set in Shanghai
Films set in the 1940s
1990s Hong Kong films